Lytta Bassett (born 25 April 1950) is a Swiss philosopher and Protestant theologian.  She is the author of several works that have reached a wide audience, especially her 2002 book Sainte Colère, released in 2007 in English translation as Holy Anger. 

Bassett was born in Raiatea in French Polynesia. She studied philosophy and theology in Strasbourg before serving as a pastor in the Reformed Church at Geneva. She later worked in India, Iran, Djibouti and the United States, before returning to Geneva to complete a doctorate. She later became a professor of Practical Theology in the Faculty of Theology of the University of Neuchâtel.

Bassett writes primarily in French, but various of her books have been translated into Dutch, English, German, Italian and Portuguese.  Christians and Sexuality in the Time of AIDS (2008) was co-authored with English theologian Timothy Radcliffe.  She was awarded the 2003 Prix Siloë Pèlerin for the original French edition of Holy Anger, the 2007 Prix de littérature religieuse for Au-delà du pardon ("Beyond forgiveness"), and the Prix du livre de spiritualité Panorama-La Procure for Aimer sans dévorer ("Loving without Devouring").  Her 2007 book Ce lien qui ne meurt jamais ("The bond that never dies") was written in response to the 2001 suicide of her 24-year-old son.

As of 2017, Lytta Basseft edits the University of Neuchâtel's international theology journal, La chair et le souffle. She is also a political activist, associated with a number of movements in favour of sustainable development and against violence.

Bibliography 
 Le pardon originel: de l'abîme du mal au pouvoir de pardonner, Éditions du Cerf, 1994
 Traces vives: paroles liturgiques pour aujourd'hui (avec Francine Carrillo et Suzanne Schell), Éd. Labor et Fides, 1997
 Le pouvoir de pardonner, Éditions Albin Michel, 1999
 Guérir du malheur, Éditions Albin Michel, 1999
 La fermeture à l'amour: un défi pratique posé à la théologie, Éd. Labor et Fides, 2000
 Holy Anger, Continuum, 2007, . (French edition Sainte Colère, 2002)
 «Moi, je ne juge personne»: l'Évangile au-delà de la morale, Éditions Albin Michel, 2003
 Émergence, Éd. Bayard, 2004
 La Joie imprenable, Éditions Albin Michel, 2004 (discussion in the magazine Esprit & Vie)
 Au-delà du pardon: le désir de tourner la page, Presses de la Renaissance, 2006 
 Ce lien qui ne meurt jamais, Éditions Albin Michel, 2007. 
 Christians and Sexuality in the Time of AIDS, with Timothy Radcliffe.  London: Continuum.   
 Apprendre à être heureux, Éditions Albin Michel, 2008
 Aimer sans dévorer, Éditions Albin Michel, 2010 
 Oser la bienveillance, Éditions Albin Michel, 2014.

References

Living people
1950 births
People from Raiatea
Swiss theologians
Swiss Calvinist and Reformed theologians
Women Christian theologians